The 1982 State of the Union Address was given by the 40th president of the United States, Ronald Reagan, on January 26, 1982, at 9:00 p.m. EST, in the chamber of the United States House of Representatives to the 97th United States Congress. It was Reagan's first State of the Union Address and his second speech to a joint session of the United States Congress. Presiding over this joint session was the House speaker, Tip O'Neill, accompanied by George H. W. Bush, the vice president.

The speech lasted 40 minutes and 14 seconds and contained 5154 words. The address was broadcast live on radio and television.

The speech was the first to acknowledge a special guest, Lenny Skutnik, who was an ordinary hero of Air Florida Flight 90 took place two weeks earlier. Taking the place of Supreme Court Justice Byron White was retired Justice Potter Stewart.

The Democratic Party response was delivered by Senator Donald Riegle (MI), Senator James Sasser (TN), Rep. Albert Gore Jr. (TN), Senator Robert Byrd (WV), Senator Edward Kennedy (MA), House Speaker Thomas P. O'Neill III (MA), Senator Gary Hart (CO), Senator Paul Sarbanes (MD), Senator J. Bennett Johnston (LA), and Senator Alan Cranston (CA).

See also 
Speeches and debates of Ronald Reagan
United States House of Representatives elections, 1982

References

External links

 (full transcript), The American Presidency Project, UC Santa Barbara.
 Full video and audio, Miller Center of Public Affairs, University of Virginia.
1982 State of the Union Address (video) at C-SPAN

State of the Union addresses
State union 1982
97th United States Congress
State of the Union Address
State of the Union Address
State of the Union Address
State of the Union Address
January 1982 events in the United States
Articles containing video clips